Benjamin "Kokoy" Trinidad Romualdez (September 24, 1930 – February 21, 2012) was a Filipino politician who served as Governor of Leyte and later appointed as ambassador to the United States, China and Saudi Arabia.

He was a younger brother to former first lady Imelda Romualdez Marcos and the father of House Majority Leader Martin Romualdez.

Personal life
The son of the late Vicente Orestes Romuáldez, a former dean of the law school of St. Paul’s College in Tacloban City, Kokoy Romualdez began his career in politics after serving as an assistant of then Speaker Daniel Romualdez from 1957 to 1961. He was a younger brother to former First Lady Imelda Marcos and the father of House Speaker Martin Romualdez. He was married to Juliette Gomez and their children are: Daniel, a practicing architect in New York, and partner Michael; Benjamin Philip, president and chief executive officer of Benguet Corp., who is married to Inquirer president and CEO Maria Alexandra; Ferdinand Martin, who is married to Yedda Marie; Marean, an investment banker, and husband Thomas; sisters Imelda Marcos, Alita Martel, Conchita Yap and brothers Alfredo and Armando.

Political life
Romualdez embarked on his own career in the diplomatic service and in politics spanning more than 20 years. He served several terms as Leyte governor from 1967 to 1986. During this time, his brother-in-law, President Ferdinand Marcos also appointed him as ambassador to China, Saudi Arabia and the United States.

Romualdez was instrumental in the establishment of diplomatic relations between the Philippines and the People’s Republic of China in the 1970s, becoming Manila’s first ambassador to Beijing. He also led the Marcos government's negotiations with the United States regarding the renegotiation of the two countries' bases agreement.

He was elected as a member of the Batasang Pambansa in 1984, but chose to remain ambassador to the United States, and was therefore was disqualified to sit in the parliament.

In 1986, he went into exile with his family following the People Power Revolution, and returned fourteen years later in 2000.

Death

He died on the afternoon of February 21, 2012 of cancer, at Makati Medical Center in Makati, Philippines at the age of 81.

References

1930 births
2012 deaths
Ambassadors of the Philippines to China
Ambassadors of the Philippines to Saudi Arabia
Ambassadors of the Philippines to the United States
Governors of Leyte (province)
Kilusang Bagong Lipunan politicians
Nacionalista Party politicians
Benjamin
Members of the Batasang Pambansa